Lorenzo Bianchetti (1545–1612) was a Roman Catholic cardinal.

References

1545 births
1612 deaths
16th-century Italian cardinals
17th-century Italian cardinals